7.7 mm may refer to:
 .303 British, also known as 7.7×56R
 Type 99 rimless 7.7 mm, Japanese bullets
 Type 92 semi-rimmed 7.7 mm, Japanese bullets
 Navy type 7.7 mm, Japanese bullets